The Breitenbush Guard Station in Willamette National Forest, Detroit, Oregon was designed by architects of the United States Forest Service and was built by the Civilian Conservation Corps in 1935.

It was listed on the National Register of Historic Places in 1986 for its Rustic architecture, as part of a multiple property listing of Depression Era works of the U.S. Forest Service in Oregon and Washington.  Its nomination asserts:The Breitenbush Guard Station exemplifies the rustic architectural idiom developed
by the Forest Service, Pacific Northwest Region, to impart Forest Service
identity and to represent its purposes and ideals; and signifies the agency's
particular interpretation of a singular expression of early twentieth century
American architectural thought.
The nomination continues to assert that the station is an "outstanding example of an architectural
locution invested with special aesthetic and associative values by the agency that created it."

The station building was an H-shaped, wood building on a concrete foundation, with a high gabled roof.

It was removed from the National Register in February 2011 after being destroyed by fire in 2000.

References

United States Forest Service ranger stations
Park buildings and structures on the National Register of Historic Places in Oregon
Government buildings completed in 1935
Buildings and structures in Marion County, Oregon
Civilian Conservation Corps in Oregon
Rustic architecture in Oregon
Willamette National Forest
1935 establishments in Oregon
National Register of Historic Places in Marion County, Oregon